Moonlite is a 1910 bushranger film about Captain Moonlite, played by John Gavin, who also directed. It was also known as Captain Moonlite and is considered a lost film.

It followed on the success of Thunderbolt (1910), also made by Gavin and Forsyth.

Synopsis
In the  early 1870s, a New Zealand army officer, Captain George Scott, is caught cheating at cards and brutally beats a fellow officer. Disgraced and discharged, he joins the clergy and falls in love with the beautiful Ruth Clarke, whose brother has embezzled a large amount of money and is going to be arrested. For her sake he robs the Edgerton Bank, and arranges to leave by boat to England. The police arrive as he gets on the boat the Lady Isabelle and although he attempts to swim away he is wounded and arrested. Constables Ryan and Mae have their first case.

Scott later escapes from gaol by strangling a warden and releasing another prisoner. He becomes a bushranger under the name of "Moonlite", forming a gang which includes Ruth's brother. He saves an aboriginal "gin" called Bunda Bunda from drowning, then goes on to rob the gold escort, distributing some of this money to the poor.

Moonlite and his gang go on to stick up a country pub and the police send Inspector Carroll and his men after him. Moonlite's gang hold up Wantabadgery Station, and Carroll gives chase but they are fought off and Bunda Bunda saves Moonlite's life.

Ryan and Mac make a capture, and Bunda Bunda shoots the tracker after Moonlite. Eventually Moonlite is captured at McCreedy's farm after a shootout by Inspector Carroll in which Bunda Bunda is killed. He is taken away to gaol for the last time to be executed. All Ruth is left with is his cross.

The chapter headings were as follows:
 The Great Military Scene
 Scott as a Minister
 Scott Robs the Egerton Bank
 Ryan and Mac's First Case
 Scott's Great Escape from the Boat Lady Isabel
 Scott's Swim: Arrest and Escape from Gaol
 The Forming of the Gang
 To the Bush ; Scott Saves Bunda Bunda; Bunda Bunda's Swim
 Gold Escort Robbery
 Scott's Kindness to the Poor
 Sticking Up the Roadside Pub
 Troopers Drilling Under Inspector Carrol
 Sticking Up Wantabadgery Station
 Great Police Chase
 Scott's Strategy and Defeat of Inspector Carrol
 Ryan and Mac Make a Capture
 Ryan and Mac Drilling for Duty
 Young Clarke, the Bushranging bareback Rider
 Bunda Bunda Shoots the Tracker
 The Great Fight at McCready's Farm
 Moonlite's last Journey to Gaol
 The Cross is All that is Left to Ruth.

Cast
 John Gavin as Captain George Scott/Captain Moonlite
 H. A. Forsyth
 Ruby Butler
 Agnes Gavin as Bunda Bunda

Production
The plot appears to have been heavily influenced by the classic novel Robbery Under Arms.

Gavin later said the film was the first script written by his wife Agnes. Female lead Ruby Butler won a beauty contest.

The film was shot at Victoria Barracks in Sydney and in the bush around Lithgow, with a budget of over £1,000. over 200 people were reportedly involved in the film.

Gavin was almost attacked by a shark while shooting an escape sequence near Glebe Island – producer H.A. Forsyth had to throw a dog overboard to distract the shark and save Gavin.

Release
Screenings of the film were usually accompanied by a lecturer.

Many advertisements for the film would mention Forysth but not Gavin.

The first public screening was a sellout. According to Gavin, the film was a massive success at the box office.

However, he then ended his association with H. A. Forsyth and instead was commissioned to make several films for Stanley Crick and Herbert Finlay, starting with Ben Hall and his Gang (1910).

According to some reports the film went for 11,000 feet (over 80 minutes). However most reports put the length of the film at 4,000 feet.

According to the Truth "the film is remarkable for its clearness, and is sure to become a great success throughout Australia."

References

External links
 
 Moonlite at the National Film and Sound Archive
 

1910 films
1910 Western (genre) films
1910 lost films
Australian black-and-white films
Bushranger films
Films directed by John Gavin
Lost Australian films
Lost Western (genre) films
Silent Australian Western (genre) films